Verhnie Ozerki (meaning "Upper Ponds") is a village in Russia, in the Buturlinovsky District of Voronezh Oblast. It is part of the Karaychevskoe Rural Settlement.

The population (as of 2010) is one person.

References

Rural localities in Buturlinovsky District